Mojca Kopač (born 2 May 1975) is a Slovenian former competitive figure skater. She is the 1993 Ondrej Nepela Memorial champion, the 1996 Golden Spin of Zagreb champion, and a nine-time Slovenian national champion. She represented her country at three Winter Olympics and qualified for the final segment twice – at the 1998 Olympics, where she placed 23rd, and the 2002 Olympics, where she placed 22nd. She reached the free skate at eleven European Championships and four World Championships.

Personal life 
Kopač was born on 2 May 1975 in Ljubljana. She married Louis Tiernan in 2007.

Career 
In the 1991–92 season, Kopač won her first senior national title and was sent to her first ISU Championship, the 1992 Europeans in Lausanne, Switzerland, where she placed 23rd. In February, she represented Slovenia at the 1992 Winter Olympics in Albertville, France. Ranked 26th in the short program, she missed the cut-off for the free skate, to which only the top 24 advanced. In March, she competed at the 1992 World Championships in Oakland, California, but was eliminated after placing 25th in the short program.

In the 1992–93 season, Kopač repeated as the Slovenian national champion. She placed 17th in both segments and 18th overall at the 1993 European Championships in Helsinki, Finland. Ranked 16th in her qualifying group, she did not advance to the short program at the 1993 World Championships in Prague.

In the following seasons, Kopač continued to qualify consistently for the free skate at the European Championships. In 1996, she reached the final segment at the World Championships for the first time in her career; she ranked 7th in her qualifying group, 15th in the short, 18th in the free, and 18th overall at the event in Edmonton, Alberta, Canada. The next season, she finished 20th at the 1997 World Championships in Lausanne after placing 13th in her qualifying group, 13th in the short, and 22nd in the free.

In January 1998, Kopač finished 13th (15th in the short, 13th in the free) at the European Championships in Milan, Italy – it was her career-best European result. In February, she  competed at her second 1998 Winter Olympics, in Nagano, Japan. Ranked 22nd in the short, she qualified for the free skate and finished 23rd overall. In April, she placed 24th (12th in her qualifying group, 23rd in the short, 24th in the free) at the 1998 World Championships in Minneapolis, Minnesota, USA.

In November 2001, Kopač competed at the Golden Spin of Zagreb, the final Olympic qualifying opportunity. Ranked 7th in the short and 10th in the free, she finished 8th overall in Croatia. Her placement gave Slovenia a spot in the ladies' figure skating event at the 2002 Winter Olympics in Salt Lake City, Utah. At her third Olympics, she qualified for the free skate by placing 19th in the short program and went on to finish 22nd overall.

In March 2003, Kopač qualified for her fourth and final free skate at the World Championships; she was 13th in her qualifying group, 22nd in the short, 17th in the free, and 20th overall at the event in Washington, D.C. In February 2004, she reached her 11th free skate at the European Championships; she ranked 11th in the short, 18th in the free, and 17th overall in Budapest, Hungary.

She retired from competition after the 2004 World Championships and began coaching in Aston, Pennsylvania.

Programs

Competitive highlights
GP: Champions Series/Grand Prix

References

External links 

 
 Slovene Skating Union: Results

1975 births
Slovenian female single skaters
Figure skaters at the 1992 Winter Olympics
Figure skaters at the 1998 Winter Olympics
Figure skaters at the 2002 Winter Olympics
Living people
Olympic figure skaters of Slovenia
Sportspeople from Ljubljana